Dujmovits is a surname.  Notable people with the surname include:

 Julia Dujmovits (born 1987), Austrian snowboarder
 Ralf Dujmovits (born 1961), German mountain climber

See also
 Dujmović